Pothyne discomaculata is a species of beetle in the family Cerambycidae. It was described by Breuning in 1940.

It is found in South India and Karnataka

References

discomaculata
Beetles described in 1940